Cathariostachys madagascariensis, the Madagascar giant bamboo or  in Malagasy language, is a bamboo species found in Madagascar.

Description
Culm diameters vary between 5 and 8 (up to 12) cm in diameter with internodes between 40 and 60 cm. Young shoots are pale to purplish green and covered with sharp, stiff, black to brown hairs. Shoots are quite bitter and have high concentrations of cyanide. Flowers are both determinant and hemispherical, an unusual form for bamboos.

Range and habitat
It is found principally in the central (Analamazaotra and around Moramunga, east of the capital Antananarivo) and southeast (Ranomafana National Park and around Ifanadiana) regions where it receives sufficient rainfall.

Ecology
It is the main food source for several species of bamboo lemurs, the only primates to subsist principally on bamboo. The destruction of the C. madagascarensis habitat due to slash and burn agriculture and over harvesting of natural stands has drastically reduced the range of both the greater bamboo lemur and especially the golden bamboo lemur. It is unknown how the lemurs can process the high amounts of cyanide, particularly in its growing shoots, without any harm.

Taxonomy
It was originally classified as a new species of Cephalostachys by A. Camus in 1925. In 1998, in part due to the prior encouragement of the late Dr. T.R. Soderstrom of the Smithsonian, S. Dransfield reexamined the classification of several bamboos from Madagascar.  Dr. S. Dransfield determined that, although sharing many similar characteristics with Cephalostachys, C. capitata and C. madagariensis are distinct from Cephalostachys. She placed both in the new genus Carthariostachys.

References

External links

madagascariensis
Plants described in 1998
Endemic flora of Madagascar
Flora of the Madagascar subhumid forests
Taxa named by Aimée Antoinette Camus